Kitahara is a Japanese surname. Notable people with the surname include:

 Hakushū Kitahara or Kitahara Ryūkichi (1885–1942), Japanese tanka poet
 Kana Kitahara (born 1988), Japanese footballer
 Kenji Kitahara (born 1976), former Japanese football player
 Koki Kitahara or Tatsumi Kitahara (born 1964), Japanese professional wrestler
 Mie Kitahara (born 1933), Japanese actress
, Japanese basketball player
 Rie Kitahara (born 1991), Japanese singer and actress
 Sayaka Kitahara (born 1993), Japanese pop singer, voice actress, and actress
 Wataru Kitahara (born 1982), Japanese futsal player

See also
 Kitahara Station

Japanese-language surnames